La tempesta (internationally released as Tempest) is a 1958 Italian drama film directed by Alberto Lattuada. It is based on A History of Pugachev (1834) and the 1836 novel The Captain's Daughter, both by Alexander Pushkin. For this film Lattuada was awarded a David di Donatello for Best Director.

Plot

Cast 
Silvana Mangano as  Masha
Van Heflin as Yemelyan Pugachev
Viveca Lindfors as   Catherine II
Geoffrey Horne as Piotr Grinov
Vittorio Gassman as Prosecutor
Agnes Moorehead as Vassilissa Mironova
Robert Keith as Capt. Mironov
Oskar Homolka as Savelic
Finlay Currie as Count Grinov
Laurence Naismith as  Maj. Zurin
Helmut Dantine as Svabrin
Fulvia Franco as Palaska
Aldo Silvani as Pope Gerasim
Claudio Gora as Minister of Caterine II
Guido Celano as the farmer
Cristina Gaioni as the young girl

References

External links

1958 films
French historical drama films
Yugoslav drama films
Italian historical drama films
1950s Italian-language films
English-language Italian films
English-language French films
English-language Yugoslav films
1950s English-language films
Films directed by Alberto Lattuada
1950s historical drama films
Films based on works by Aleksandr Pushkin
Films set in the Russian Empire
Films produced by Dino De Laurentiis
Cultural depictions of Catherine the Great
1958 drama films
The Captain's Daughter
1950s Italian films
1950s French films
Italian-language French films
1950s multilingual films
French multilingual films
Yugoslav multilingual films
Italian multilingual films